Lisa Gornick (born 1970) is a British actress, screenwriter, film director, and producer. She is an artist who works in film, performance, TV, and drawing.

Work 

Gornick's first feature film was Do I Love You?. It is set in London and revolves around the relationship between Marina (Gornick) and Romy (Raquel Cassidy). In 2014, the British Film Institute included the film in its Top 10 Greatest Movies About Lesbians. Her second feature film, Tick Tock Lullaby is a comedy about the ambivalence around becoming a parent. In 2007, it screened at the San Francisco International LGBT Festival and the Cinequest Film Festival. Gornick's third feature film, The Book of Gabrielle, was created as part of a cross-platform production that also included a book, a web series, and a live drawing show.

Gornick's work for television includes the 2010 short film, Dip, which was made for the BBC Channel 4's Coming Up Season and won the Youth Jury Award for Best Film at Oberhausen Film Festival 2011. Gornick co-starred in the film The Owls (Cheryl Dunye, 2010). She set up the production company Valiant Doll, which makes micro budget feature films.

Filmography

See also
 List of female film and television directors
 List of lesbian filmmakers
 List of LGBT-related films directed by women

References

External links 
 

1970 births
Living people
21st-century English actresses
Actresses from London
English film actresses
English lesbian actresses
English women film directors
English film producers
British women screenwriters
English-language film directors
English lesbian writers
LGBT film directors
LGBT producers
British LGBT screenwriters
English LGBT actors
British women film producers
British experimental filmmakers
British women artists
Women experimental filmmakers
20th-century English LGBT people
21st-century English LGBT people